Jalan McClendon (born October 21, 1995) is an American football quarterback for the Vegas Vipers of the XFL.

Initially committing to NC State and serving as a backup quarterback, McClendon played his final year of college football with the Baylor Bears football program. After spending some time in the offseason with both the Baltimore Ravens and the then-named Washington Redskins, McClendon was drafted by the Los Angeles Wildcats, where he backed up Josh Johnson at quarterback, until the cancellation of the 2020 XFL season due to the COVID-19 pandemic.

Early years 
McClendon attended West Mecklenburg High School in Charlotte, North Carolina, playing quarterback for the team, as well as playing some high school basketball. During McClendon's junior season, he threw for over 1,700 yards and amassed 22 passing touchdowns. In McClendon's senior season with West Mecklenburg, he was vital to leading his high school to the North Carolina 4AA state playoffs, leading his school to a 9–3 record, while adding 1,700 passing yards and 17 passing touchdowns.

Graded out as a 3-star quarterback out of high school by Rivals.com, and as a 4-star quarterback by On3.com, and by 247Sports, McClendon received multiple offers and visits from Tennessee, North Carolina, South Carolina, East Carolina, Florida State, Miami (FL), NC State, and Virginia, before ultimately committing to the NC State football team on May 15, 2013, and signing his letter of intent on February 5, 2014.

College career

NC State 
In 2014, McClendon redshirted to preserve his future eligibility.

After Florida transfer quarterback Jacoby Brissett took over the starting quarterback job in 2014, and true freshman quarterback Jakobi Meyers redshirting 2015 and undergoing knee surgery, McClendon played 7 games for NC State as the backup quarterback to Brissett.

Following the 2015 season, Brissett graduated and was selected in the 3rd round of the 2016 NFL Draft by the New England Patriots. This opened up a quarterback competition between McClendon and Myers, with Boise State quarterback transfer Ryan Finley joining the NC State football team in  2016. McClendon was able to beat out Myers in the quarterback competition, forcing Meyers to start playing the wide receiver position. However, Finley would win the starting quarterback job, and McClendon for the second season in the row served as the backup quarterback for the NC State football team. McClendon saw more action at quarterback in 2016, scoring his first passing and rushing touchdown in college during September game against the Old Dominion Monarchs, and seeing playing time in 10 games in 2016 at quarterback.

With Finley fully entrenched as the starting quarterback of the NC State, McClendon only appeared in 3 games, and only attempting 3 passes. Following the 2017 season, McClendon graduated from NC State, and transferred to Baylor to play quarterback for the team, with one year of college football eligibility left, and due to Finley being granted an additional year of eligibility by the NCAA.

Baylor 
Brought in to compete for the starting quarterback job for Baylor in 2018, McClendon competed with returning starter Charlie Brewer in the spring, with Brewer ultimately winning the starting job, but McClendon still seeing action at quarterback for the team. McClendon saw his first start at quarterback on November 3, 2018, against Oklahoma State. Despite McClendon's best efforts, Baylor trailed 24–14 in the 3rd quarter, which lead to head coach Matt Rhule to bench McClendon in favor of Brewer. Baylor would come back from behind, and win on a Charlie Brewer touchdown pass to Denzel Mims with 7 seconds remaining. McClendon would not receive another start in 2018, and remained as the backup quarterback for the rest of the year, playing occasionally in 9 games in 2018.

Professional career 
McClendon went unselected in the 2019 NFL Draft.

Baltimore Ravens 
On May 13, 2019, McClendon was signed by the Baltimore Ravens as an undrafted free agent. However, on May 17, 2019, McClelland and defensive tackle Kalil Morris were waived and subsequently cut from the Ravens to free up roster spots for Shane Ray and Michael Floyd.

McClendon worked out with the New York Giants on July 27, 2019, but was not offered a contract by the team.

Washington Redskins 
On August 11, 2019, McClendon was signed by the then-named Washington Redskins after Josh Woodrum was placed on injured reserve for a torn pectoral muscle. McClendon received playing time during the preseason, but completed only 4 out of 10 passes attempted for 16 passing yards, no touchdowns, and one interception. On August 31, 2019, McClendon was cut by the team as part of the final cuts to get to the 53-man active roster limit.

Later that week, the New York Giants worked out McClendon, but was once again not offered a contract by the team.

On September 23, 2019, the Green Bay Packers brought in McClendon for a workout, but was not offered a contract by the team.

Los Angeles Wildcats
On October 7, 2019, McClendon was one of many quarterbacks included in the draft pool of the 2020 XFL revival. On October 16, McClendon was drafted by the Los Angeles Wildcats during the Phase 5: Open Draft section.

Prior to the Wildcats' first season, McClendon made the team as a backup quarterback for the team leading into their first career game. In the Wildcats' first ever game against the Houston Roughnecks, thanks to an injury to presumptive starting quarterback Josh Johnson going into the game, and an injury to Chad Kanoff, the quarterback that started the Wildcats' first ever game after a big hit, McClendon made his professional football debut, going 1 for 4 (25%) passing, no passing yards, and threw an interception. During the Wildcats' week 3 game against the DC Defenders, McClendon took over at quarterback, recording a 3-yard rush. McClelland would record no other stats for the remainder of the season, and the XFL shut down operations and laid off all employees after week five of their inaugural season.

Vegas Viper 
On November 15, 2022, McClendon was selected by the Vegas Vipers of the XFL during Phase 0 of the 2023 XFL Draft.

Career statistics

References 

Living people
1995 births
NC State Wolfpack football players
Baylor Bears football players
Baltimore Ravens players
Washington Redskins players
Los Angeles Wildcats (XFL) players
Vegas Vipers players
American football quarterbacks